The Seoak Seowon is a seowon located in the neighborhood of Seoak-dong, Gyeongju, North Gyeongsang Province, South Korea. Seowon was a type of local academy during the Joseon Dynasty (1392–1897). It was established by local Confucian scholars especially Yi Jeong (李楨 1578 - 1607) in 1651, the second year of King Hyojong's reign, to commemorate the virtue and scholarly achievements of scholar Seol Chong, and Choe Chi-won and General Kim Yu-sin. The enshrined people played important roles in the unification of Three Kingdoms of Korea into the Silla kingdom.

See also
Oksan Seowon, Gyeongju
Korean Confucianism

References

External links
 서악서원 at Cultural Heritage Administration

Seowon
Buildings and structures in Gyeongju
1651 establishments in Asia